Mário Artur Borges Oliveira (born 14 May 1969), simply known as Mário Artur, is a former Portuguese born Mozambican footballer and current assistant manager of Académica de Coimbra.

International career
Artur played 17 times for the Mozambican national team, scoring his only goal on 18 August 1998 against Portugal, in a friendly.

International goals

References

External links

1969 births
Living people
Sportspeople from Funchal
Mozambican footballers
Association football midfielders
Segunda Divisão players
S.C. Campomaiorense players
Liga Portugal 2 players
U.D. Leiria players
Primeira Liga players
Moreirense F.C. players
S.C. Olhanense players
GD Beira-Mar players
Mozambique international footballers
1998 African Cup of Nations players
Portuguese people of Mozambican descent